In enzymology, a triacylglycerol---sterol O-acyltransferase is an enzyme that catalyzes the chemical reaction

triacylglycerol + a 3beta-hydroxysterol  diacylglycerol + a 3beta-hydroxysterol ester

Thus, the two substrates of this enzyme are triacylglycerol and 3beta-hydroxysterol, whereas its two products are diacylglycerol and 3beta-hydroxysterol ester.

This enzyme belongs to the family of transferases, specifically those acyltransferases transferring groups other than aminoacyl groups.  The systematic name of this enzyme class is triacylglycerol:3beta-hydroxysterol O-acyltransferase. This enzyme is also called triacylglycerol:sterol acyltransferase.

References

 

EC 2.3.1
Enzymes of unknown structure